Yrjö Jalmari "Yka" Hietanen (12 July 1927 – 26 March 2011) was a Finnish sprint canoer who competed at the 1952 and 1956 Olympics. In 1952 he won two gold medals with Kurt Wires in the 1000 m and 10000 m events. In 1956 he placed seventh over 10000 m.

References

1927 births
2011 deaths
Sportspeople from Helsinki
Canoeists at the 1952 Summer Olympics
Canoeists at the 1956 Summer Olympics
Finnish male canoeists
Olympic canoeists of Finland
Olympic gold medalists for Finland
Olympic medalists in canoeing

Medalists at the 1952 Summer Olympics